Joshua Sean Rymell (born 4 April 2001) is an English cricketer. Rymell joined Essex age group teams in 2015, but had to overcome the setback of an anterior cruciate ligament injury in August 2019, prior to signing his first rookie contract with Essex in 2020. He made his Twenty20 debut on 18 July 2021, for Essex in the 2021 T20 Blast.

Rymell made his List A debut on 1 August 2021, for Essex in the 2021 Royal London One-Day Cup. During the tournament, Rymell scored his first century in a List A match, with 121 runs against Yorkshire in the quarter-finals. Rymell made his first-class debut on 30 August 2021, for Essex in the 2021 County Championship.

References

External links
 

2001 births
Living people
English cricketers
Essex cricketers
Cricketers from Ipswich
Suffolk cricketers
People educated at Ipswich School